A marmot is a member of the genus Marmota.

Marmot may also refer to:

People
 Janine Marmot, British film producer
 Sir Michael Marmot (born 1945), British scientist

Places
 Marmot, Oregon, United States
 Marmot District, Gran Chimú, Peru
 Marmot Basin, a Canadian ski area
 Marmot Dome, the one dome east of Fairview Dome
 Marmot Island, an island in the Gulf of Alaska
 Marmot Pass, a trail corridor in Washington state

Other uses
 Marmot (company), an outdoor clothing and sporting goods company
 Marmot (grape), another name for the German wine grape Elbling

See also
 Marmot Day, a celebration featuring marmots
 La Marmotte, a one-day cyclosportive event
 Le Marmot (1976–1981), a French Thoroughbred racehorse and sire
 Cro-Marmot, a character from Happy Tree Friends